The Missile Transportable Anti-aérien Léger (English: Transportable lightweight anti-air missile), commonly called Mistral, is a French infrared homing short range air defense system manufactured by MBDA France (formerly by Matra Defence and then Matra BAe Dynamics). Based on the French SATCP (Sol-Air à Très Courte Portée), the portable missile later to become the Mistral began development in 1974. It was initially deployed in 1988 for the first version (S1), 1997 for the second version (M2), and 2019 for the third version (M3).

Description 

Mistral is a short-range air defence (SHORAD) missile system that can be used from vehicles, surface ships, and helicopters, as well as in a portable configuration. When used in the MANPADS role the "Mistral" missile is transported in a transport and launch container (MPC) together with "friend or foe" interrogator, power source and tripod with its sighting devices. They are then to be operated by a pair of crew as commander and the shooter. There are also launch units that allow the missile to be fired from armoured vehicles, ships or helicopters (such as the Aérospatiale Gazelle, Denel Rooivalk, or Eurocopter Tiger). To defeat flares ejected from the rear of a targeted aircraft, proportional navigation using a gyro as a reference is adopted for Mistral, instead of the pursuit method in earlier IR-guided MANPADS. To further enhance the ECCM capability, the seeker of Mistral has a very narrow field of view to reject decoys and interference, the seeker can tilt in the range of +/− 38 degrees. On the launcher, the missile runs up the gyro in 2 seconds, and total reaction time is 5 seconds. The all-aspect two-color (2–4 and 3–5 µm) cooled IR-seeker of Mistral is developed by SAT (Societe Anonyme de Telecommunications), and the missile adopts both laser proximity and impact fuzes.

The MCP (Mistral Coordination Post) was first shown at the 1991 Paris Air Show fitted with SHORAR (Short-range Anti-aircraft Defence Radar) from Oerlikon Contraves. The MCP is designed to be used with a portable Mistral system, ATLAS, ALBI or MPCV systems and also used as part of MBDA Mistral missile Ground Based Air Defence (GBAD) systems for air defense of military units and important facilities.

The MCP provides target designation and fire control for eleven Mistral firing unit, ALBI, ATLAS or MPCV air defence systems. The MCP is mounted on a truck chassis or any other off-road chassis. The newer version of MCP are called the IMCP or Improved Missile Control Post.

A close-in weapon system based on Mistral is a six-missile version called Sadral, with a stabilized rapid-reload launcher that is fully automated. A CSEE developed fire control director is integrated to the launcher, consisted of TV camera and FLIR. Image produced by both directors appear on the screen in the operator console below deck, and the missiles are locked onto the target before being launched. A fully loaded Sadral launcher weighs 1080 kg, and the operator console weighs 280 kg. A two-missile unit installed on ships is called Simbad, and a newly launched four-missile version is called Tetral. An evolution of the Simbad is now proposed: Simbad RC.  Both Tetral and Simbad RC are remote controlled from the ship's deck while the original Simbad is manually operated with a simple optical sight.

Variants 
The Mistral entered production in 1989 and is now deployed in various forms by 37 armed forces of 25 countries including Austria, the Brazilian Marine Corps, Chile, Colombia, Cyprus, Ecuador, Estonia, Finland, France, Hungary, Indonesia, Morocco, New Zealand, Oman, Pakistan, Philippines, South Korea, Singapore, Spain, and Venezuela.
Norway donated their complete stock of Mistral missiles in 2022 to Ukraine.

Land system 

 MANPADS: Basic Mistral missile used with a man-portable launch unit, manually operated.
 ALAMO: Mistral missile mount with single missile, used on light vehicles, manually operated.
 ALBI: Mounting system with 2 Mistral missiles. It is used on wheeled, or lightly armored vehicles, manually operated.
 ATLAS: Improved ground or vehicle based mount with 2 Mistral missiles, manually operated.
 ATLAS RC: Further development of ATLAS system, remotely operated.
 ASPIC: Mounting for light vehicle with 4 Mistral missiles, remotely operated. 
 MPCV: Turret for light vehicle with 4 Mistral missiles and single cannon or heavy machinegun, automatic fire control with EO system.
 PAMELA: Mistral missile mount with single missile, used on VLRA or TRM 2000 trucks, manually operated.
 SANTAL: Turret for armored vehicles with 6 Mistral missiles, automatic fire control with search radar.

Naval system 

 SIMBAD: Mistral missile mount system with 2 missiles, manually operated.
 SIMBAD RC: Development of regular SIMBAD system, remotely operated.
 TETRAL: Mounting system with 4 Mistral missiles, automatic fire control with FCR or EO system.
 SADRAL: Mount with 6 Mistral missiles, automatic fire control with FCR or EO system.
 SIGMA: Combination of 25 or 30mm autocannon and 3 Mistral missiles, automatic fire control with FCR or EO system.
 SAKO M85 Mistral: Naval turret with 6 Mistral missiles based on Finland SAKO 23 M85, remotely operated.

Airborne system 

 ATAM: Helicopter version used as an air-to-air weapon with 2 missiles on each module.

Submarine air defence system 

 On 26 September 2012 DCNS at the company's Le Mourillon plant announced plans to design and build a submarine canister-based air defence weapon based on the Mistral.

Service history
Mistral missiles used by the Rwandan forces in the Second Congo War shot down a Zimbabwean Air Force BAE Hawk fighter on 23 March 1999.

Two automated SADRAL launchers (re-cycled from the retiring s) and each equipped with six Mistral Mk 3 surface-to-air missiles are to be fitted to three s of the French Navy in the 2021–2023 period. The system replaced the previous Crotale SAM system in order to provide a modernized defence against sea-skimming targets. The Mistral Mk 3 carries an infrared imaging seeker and possesses advanced image processing capabilities. This allows it to engage low thermal signature targets such as: UAVs, turbojet-powered missiles and fast craft at long range, while reportedly offering resistance to countermeasures. The system is also carried on the aircraft carrier Charles de Gaulle, the s and (SIMBAD-RC) is being installed on the French Navy's Jacques Chevallier-class support ships.

Two Sadral turrets for Mistral were also installed on the raised deck on each side of the helicopter hangar of the former s. Space for the SADRAL/Mistral system is also provided for on the French s but, as of 2021, has not been installed on those vessels.

Norway sent 100 Mistral systems to Ukraine shortly after the start of the 2022 Russian invasion of Ukraine. In response to the need for faster weapon shipments as a result of the war, in early 2023 MBDA started accelerating production of the Mistral 3 from 20 to 30 missiles per month.

Operators

Current operators 

 
 
 
 
 
 
 
 
  
 
 
 
 
 : Used as air-to-air missiles for HAL Prachand and HAL Rudra attack helicopters.
 
 
 
 
 
 
 
 
 
 : First contract consists of 406 launchers and 2,760 missiles.
 
 
 : Delivered by France and Norway as military aid in anticipation of and during the 2022 Russian invasion.
 
 : Used on Skjold-class corvettes

Future operators

Former operators
 
  (not listed among current Finland Army equipment by IISS Military Balance 2020)
  (not listed among current New Zealand Army equipment by IISS Military Balance 2017)

See also
 Anza (missile)
 Misagh-2
 Qaem
 FIM-92 Stinger
 Grom (missile)
 Starstreak missile
 9K38 Igla
 RBS 70
 QW-3

References

External links

 Video of a Mistral missile being fired
 MBDA MISTRAL family

Air-to-air missiles of France
Matra
Naval surface-to-air missiles
Naval surface-to-air missiles of France
Surface-to-air missiles of France
Military equipment introduced in the 1980s